Wolfgang Kirchgässner (1 June 1928 – 26 March 2014) was a Catholic bishop.

Ordained to the priesthood in 1954, Kirchgässner was named titular bishop of Druas and auxiliary bishop of the Roman Catholic Archbishop of Freiburg, Germany. He resigned in 1998.

Notes

1928 births
2014 deaths
German Roman Catholic titular bishops